The Okanagan International Marathon is an annual marathon event held in Kelowna, British Columbia, Canada. The race has been run each year since 1995 and is a Boston Marathon qualifying race.

History 
The Okanagan International Marathon is as a major fundraiser for the interior of BC.  Held in the fall in Kelowna and has a history of Boston qualifying times on a course, which attracts both the elite and recreational runner. To date the Okanagan International Marathon has donated in excess of $173,000 dollars to the Sunshine Foundation Dream for Kids. Growing from a small marathon with a group of dedicated runners the event today has over 3,400 participants.

The event includes the Full Marathon, Half Marathon, 10K & 5K Family Fun Run/Walk as well as the BMO Kids run. On October 10, 2010, runners converged on Kelowna’s City Park for the 42.2 km marathon, 21.1 km half-marathon and 10 km walk and run.

Results

See also
 List of marathon races in North America

References

External links 
 Okanagan International Marathon 

Marathons in Canada
Recurring sporting events established in 1995
Annual sporting events in Canada
Sport in Kelowna
1995 establishments in British Columbia
Fall events in Canada